Forties can mean:
1940s, the years 1940–1949
40s, the years 40-49 AD
The years 40-49 of any century - see List of decades
Long Forties, area in the North Sea
The  Forties shipping forecast area (roughly corresponding to the Long Forties)
Forties oilfield in the North Sea
Forties pipeline system
Roaring Forties, strong westerly winds found in the Southern Hemisphere
Forty-ounce or forty, a glass bottle that holds 40 fluid ounces of malt liquor or beer.